David "Dave" Sykes is a former professional rugby league footballer who played in the 1980s. He played at club level for the Featherstone Rovers (Heritage № 652).

Playing career
David Sykes made his début for the Featherstone Rovers on Friday 1 January 1988.

References

Featherstone Rovers players
Living people
Place of birth missing (living people)
English rugby league players
Year of birth missing (living people)